was a screw sloop in the early Imperial Japanese Navy, and was the first vessel built by the Yokosuka Naval Arsenal after its acquisition by the Meiji government. It was one of the first domestically-produced warships in Japan.

Background
Seiki was designed as a wooden-hulled three-masted bark-rigged sloop with a coal-fired triple-expansion reciprocating steam engine with three cylinders and two cylindrical boilers driving a single screw. Her hull was made largely of native keyaki wood. She was laid down at Yokosuka Naval Arsenal on 20 June 1873 under the direction of Léonce Verny, a French naval engineer initially hired by the Tokugawa shogunate, who stayed on as a foreign advisor to the early Meiji government as chief administrator and constructor of the Yokosuka Naval Arsenal. She was launched on 5 May 1875, with Emperor Meiji personally attending the launching ceremony. 
She was commissioned into the Imperial Japanese Navy on 21 June 1876.

Operational history

Lieutenant Commander Inoue Yoshika oversaw the completion of Seiki and was both her chief outfitting officer and first captain. Soon after completion, in November 1878, Inoue took Seiki to Europe, marking the first long-distance voyage by a domestically-produced Japanese warship. Along the way, Seiki passed through the Suez Canal and made port calls at Constantinople and London, among other places, and was hailed in the western press as the first Japanese-built and Japanese-crewed warship to make such a voyage. Inoue successfully completed the mission, returning to Japan in August 1879.
At around 0200 hours on 7 December 1888, Seiki ran aground in Suruga Bay near the mouth of the Fuji River at position. She was unable to free herself, and broke up and sank at 1400 hours on 10 December 1888 .

References
Chesneau, Roger and Eugene M. Kolesnik (editors), All The World's Fighting Ships 1860-1905, Conway Maritime Press, 1979 reprinted 2002,

External links

Notes

Screw sloops of the Imperial Japanese Navy
1875 ships
Three-masted ships
Ships built by Yokosuka Naval Arsenal
Naval ships of Japan